The 2000–01 season saw Swansea City compete in the Football League Second Division where they finished in 23rd position with 37 points and were relegated to the Third Division.

Final league table

Results
Swansea City's score comes first

Legend

Football League Second Division

FA Cup

Football League Cup

Football League Trophy

Squad statistics

References

External links
 Swansea City 2000–01 at Soccerbase.com (select relevant season from dropdown list)

2000-01
Welsh football clubs 2000–01 season
2000–01 Football League Second Division by team